London Dreams is a 2009 Indian Hindi-language musical drama film directed and produced by Vipul Amrutlal Shah. The film stars 
Ajay Devgn andSalman Khan  in lead role while Asin plays the female lead.Rannvijay Singh, Om Puri, and newcomer Aditya Roy Kapur also featured in supporting roles. The film had a worldwide release on 30 October 2009 and was a commercial failure. It marks the second collaboration between Devgn and Khan  after Hum Dil De Chuke Sanam (1999).

Plot
The story revolves around two childhood friends, Arjun (played by Ajay Devgn) and Mannu (played by Salman Khan). When Arjun was 17 years old, he was more focused on becoming a singer but his father disagreed therefore he began praying for his death so he can go to London. The only one who consoled him was his 15 years old friend Mannu. After Arjun's father dies, he finally travels to London with his uncle (Om Puri) whom he later runs away from after arriving.

Arjun, now 35 years old creates a fledgling band with Zoheb and Wasim (Rannvijay Singh and Aditya Roy Kapoor, respectively), two brothers who duped their relatives in Pakistan to travel to London in pursuit of their musical aspirations. He also brings aboard Priya (played by Asin), a music enthusiast from a conservative South Indian family. Back in India, Mannu seduces married women and finds himself in debt with the locals.

After paying his debt, Mannu goes to London to join Arjun's band, but becomes more popular with the crowds. Mannu also flirts with Priya.

The band embarks on a three-city tour spanning Paris, Rome, and Amsterdam where Arjun deceives a naive Mannu into a rollercoaster ride of promiscuous sex and illicit drugs. He tricks him, gets him addicted to drugs, and then gets him arrested in a car full of them. While pretending to help Mannu, Arjun leaks the drug story to the press. As the three-city tour concludes, the band heads to London to perform at Wembley Stadium in front of an audience estimated at 90,000 (which is of significance since, earlier in the movie, the viewer is told that Arjun's grandfather had failed before a similarly huge audience). Knowing how important this is for Arjun, Mannu tries to give up drugs. But Arjun decides that his success and Mannu's total failure are related. He pays a girl to pretend to have oral sex with Mannu, which makes Priya break up with Mannu. In this fragile state, Zoheb pushes Mannu toward drugs again and his mental state is now so fragile that he can't face appearing on stage.

In the moments leading up to the stage entrance, Mannu comes to senses and chooses the righteous path and runs to support his mate. But Arjun, who has become incensed with the crowd chanting Mannu's name, confesses his envy of Mannu's talent and what he did to finish Mannu off. The audience boos Arjun, the show ends in chaos, the band breaks up and a sad Mannu eventually returns to his village.

Arjun's uncle advises him to apologize to Mannu. Then it is revealed that after knowing the truth Priya and Mannu reconcile. Also, she marries Mannu and lives with him in his village. In the village, however, Mannu tells him not to apologize saying that it was his fault that he didn't see Arjun's sorrow and Priya also pardons Arjun for his wrong deeds. They get back together and London Dreams becomes a successful band again.

Cast
 Ajay Devgn as Arjun Joshi
 Salman Khan as Manjeet "Mannu" Khosla
 Asin as Priya Zaveri
 Om Puri as Kanjeshwar Joshi, Arjun's uncle
 Aditya Roy Kapur as Wasim Khan, Zoheb's brother
 Rannvijay Singh as Zoheb Khan, Wasim's brother
 Ajay Kalyansingh as Office Worker

Production
Initially Raj Kumar santoshi was supposed to direct it with Aamir Khan & Shah Rukh Khan but things didn't work out and he left the project. Later Vipul shah made it with Salman Khan & Ajay Devgn. Asin gave audition for it in 2008. Akshay Kumar was first choice of Vipul but had date issue so he was unable to sign the movie.
Also initially A.R Rahman was approached for the music but he opted out citing date issues, then trio of Shankar–Ehsaan–Loy were approached for the music.

Reception

Critical response
London Dreams received mixed to negative reviews from critics. Taran Adarsh praised the performance of the principal cast, while criticizing the climax. Rajeev Masand gave a scathing review of the movie, describing it as a "good film about foolish people." Chandrima Pal of Rediff criticized the background music of the movie, while praising the dialogues, as well as Ajay Devgan's performance. Noyon Jyoti Parasara of AOL said "The last twenty minutes of ‘London Dreams’ take away half its spirit." even though it was a box office success.

Soundtrack
Music was composed by Shankar–Ehsaan–Loy with lyrics written by Prasoon Joshi.

The song style is generally rock inspired to match the motifs in the movie.

References

External links
 

2009 films
2000s Hindi-language films
Films scored by Shankar–Ehsaan–Loy
2000s musical drama films
Viacom18 Studios films
Films directed by Vipul Amrutlal Shah
Indian musical drama films